The 1873 New Jersey Athletic Club football team represented New Jersey Athletic Club in the 1873 college football season. New Jersey compiled a 0–1 record in the season, losing their only game to Stevens.

Schedule

References

New Jersey Athletic Club
New Jersey Athletic Club football seasons
New Jersey Athletic Club football
College football winless seasons